Armsmear ("meadow of arms"), also known as the Samuel Colt Home, is a historic house located at 80 Wethersfield Avenue in Hartford, Connecticut. It was the family home of firearm manufacturer Samuel Colt.  Armsmear was listed as a National Historic Landmark in 1976; this designation was expanded in 2008 to form the Coltsville Historic District, a National Historic Landmark District.

History

Armsmear was planned for Colt's 1856 marriage to Elizabeth Hart Jarvis, and constructed in 1856 to designs by an unknown architect, possibly local architect Octavius Jordan or factory engineer H. A. G. Pomeroy, on grounds overlooking the recently completed Colt Armory.  It was described by a contemporary thus: "an Italian villa in stone, massive, noble, refined, yet not carrying out any decided principle of architecture, it is like its originator, bold and unusual in its combinations." It features a low-pitched roof, heavy bracketed cornice, round-arched doors and windows, iron balconies, Italianate tower and details, and Turkish domes and pinnacles.

The Colts occupied Armsmear in 1857 and promptly began to develop its gardens. Landscape architects Cleveland and Copeland provided the plans. Unusual, glass-domed conservatories, inspired by London's Crystal Palace, were added in 1861–1862.

The house and manicured grounds were the primary residence of Samuel Colt and his family. The Colts entertained lavishly at the estate, holding large parties that were the highlight of the Hartford society season.  Samuel Colt lived in Armsmear for approximately 5 years from 1857 until his death in 1862. He was buried on the grounds of Armsmear near the graves of Sam and Elizabeth's young children, amidst a copse of weeping willows known as the 'Grove of Graves.'   Following her husband's death, Elizabeth Hart Colt and her son Caldwell Hart Colt lived together in the large home for several decades. In 1894, Elizabeth had Samuel Colt and four of their children buried at Armsmear reinterred to Cedar Hill Cemetery.

After Elizabeth Colt died in 1905, the house was converted to a home for Episcopal women (in 1911) under the terms of her will. The residential community to this day is administrated by the Colt Trust. She also gave  of Armsmear's grounds to create Hartford's Colt Park. The city has subsequently replaced the greenhouse, garden, and ponds with ball fields and a skating rink.

References

Sources

Houses completed in 1856
Houses in Hartford, Connecticut
Houses on the National Register of Historic Places in Connecticut
Historic American Buildings Survey in Connecticut
Historic district contributing properties in Connecticut
Italianate architecture in Connecticut
Villas in the United States
1855 establishments in Connecticut
National Register of Historic Places in Hartford, Connecticut
Colt family